Stade de Mbour is a Senegalese football club based in Mbour. They currently play in the Senegal Premier League.

They played the 2010 season in the top division in Senegalese football and were part of the Senegal Ligue 2. Their home stadium is Stade Municipal de Mbour.

Achievements
Senegal Premier League: 0

Senegal FA Cup: 0

Coupe de la Ligue: 1
 2017.

Senegal Assemblée Nationale Cup: 2
 2009, 2010.

Trophée des Champions du Sénégal: 0

Super Coupe du Sénégal: 0

References

External links
Team profile - soccerway.com

Football clubs in Senegal
Football clubs in Serer country
1960 establishments in Senegal